The First Presbyterian Church in Ashland, Kentucky  is a historic church building at 1600 Winchester Avenue.  It has also been known as Bethesda Church.  It was built in 1858 and added to the National Register of Historic Places in 1973.

It was then the oldest structure still being used for a church in Boyd County.  It is a red brick building with a bell tower and stained glass windows.

The building was the third of the congregation;  its first was a log building used from 1819 to 1928.

References

See also
National Register of Historic Places listings in Kentucky

Presbyterian churches in Kentucky
Churches on the National Register of Historic Places in Kentucky
Churches completed in 1858
19th-century Presbyterian church buildings in the United States
Churches in Boyd County, Kentucky
National Register of Historic Places in Boyd County, Kentucky
1858 establishments in Kentucky
Individually listed contributing properties to historic districts on the National Register in Kentucky